Khareef (autumn) is a colloquial Arabic term used in southern Oman, southeastern Yemen, southwestern Saudi Arabia and Sudan for the southeastern monsoon. The monsoon affects Dhofar and Al Mahrah Governorates from about June to early September. Towns such as Salalah depend upon the khareef for water supply. An annual Khareef festival is held in Salalah to celebrate the monsoon and attracts tourists.

The Khareef leads to a unique ecological habitat along the coast known as the Arabian Peninsula coastal fog desert.

References

External links

 Oman: Essential Information
  Salalah and the Khareef
 Khareef Festival: A Bird's Eye View

Tropical meteorology
Climate of Asia